Joe Sims may refer to:

 Joe Sims (actor), British actor
 Joe Sims (American football) (born 1969), American football player who played for the Atlanta Falcons for five seasons
 Joe Sims (politician), American politician, Co-Chair of the Communist Party of the United States of America (CPUSA)